Microdon ocellaris (Curran 1924), the hairy-legged ant fly, is a rare species of syrphid fly observed in the eastern United States. Hoverflies can remain nearly motionless in flight. The adults are also known as flower flies for they are commonly found on flowers, from which they get both energy-giving nectar and protein-rich pollen (though Microdon species are seldom seen on flowers). The larvae have been found in the nests of Formica schaufussi.

References

Diptera of North America
Hoverflies of North America
Insects described in 1924
Taxa named by Charles Howard Curran